Louis Claude Marie Richard (19 September 1754 – 6 June 1821) was a French botanist and botanical illustrator.

Richard was born at Versailles. Between 1781 and 1789 he collected botanical specimens in Central America and the West Indies. On his return he became a professor at the École de médecine in Paris.

His books included Demonstrations botaniques (1808), De Orchideis europaeis (1817), Commentatio botanica de Conifereis et Cycadeis (1826) and De Musaceis commentatio botanica (1831).

He gave us the special description terminology for the orchids, such as pollinium and gynostemium.

The genus Richardia Kunth, (Araceae) was named in his honor. It is now a synonym of the genus Zantedeschia .
This botanist is denoted by the author abbreviation Rich. when citing a botanical name.

His son was another notable botanist, Achille Richard.

He also discovered Morgat in the 1880s.

Eponyms 
A species of Caribbean lizard, Anolis richardii, is named in honor of Louis Claude Richard. A species of Caribbean snake, Typhlops richardii, is named in honor of either Louis Claude Richard or his son Achille Richard.

Note 
 Other botanists called Richard are:
 Achille Richard (1794–1852), his son (A.Rich.)
 Jean Michel Claude Richard (1787–1868) (J.M.C.Rich.)
 Olivier Jules Richard (1836–1896) (O.J.Rich.)
 Claude Richard fl. (C.Rich)
 Joseph Herve Pierre Richard (J.H.P.Rich.)

References

Further reading 
 Urban, Ignaz. Notae biographicae, Symb. Antill. 3:111,1900.

Botanical illustrators
1754 births
1821 deaths
Botanists with author abbreviations
Bryologists
French taxonomists
Pteridologists
Botanists active in Central America
Botanists active in North America
Botanists active in the Caribbean
Members of the French Academy of Sciences
People from Versailles
18th-century French botanists
19th-century French botanists